Agnuside is a chemical compound found in Vitex agnus-castus. Agnuside is the ester of aucubin and p-hydroxybenzoic acid.

References 

Iridoid glycosides
Phenol glucosides
Cyclopentenes